Edition Güntersberg is a German publishing house of classical music, focused on compositions for the viola da gamba. It was founded in Heidelberg in 1990 by Günter von Zadow and Leonore von Zadow-Reichling, who is a professional gambist. In addition to works from Renaissance and Baroque, the company has published music from the early  classical period, for both viola da gamba, for example by Carl Friedrich Abel, and baryton, including works by Joseph Haydn.

Publishing history 
In 2007 they published several works by Dieterich Buxtehude, including Mit Fried und Freud, one of the few works printed during the composer's lifetime. A copy is held by the Badische Landesbibliothek, shown in facsimile along with the new edition. A review of their edition of a duo sonata for violin and viola da gamba by Buxtehde noted the detailed preface, relevant for historically informed performance, and a facsimile of the original, also the setting in modern style faithful to the composer's accidentals, and without added dynamic marking. Players find both a score with figured bass, and a keyboard part with a suggestion. They published the many string trios for baryton, viola and cello by Joseph Haydn, for example numbers 97 to 126 in 2009. In 2010 they published Alexander Ferdinand Grychtolik's reconstruction of Bach's lost homage cantata O angenehme Melodei, based on a wedding cantata.

In 2016 they published Telemann's Twelve Fantasias for Viola da Gamba solo (Twelve Fantasies pour la Basse de Violle) which had been thought to be lost. Based on research of a French musicologist, they were found in an archive and first performed by the gambist Thomas Fritzsch, who is also a musicologist teaching at the Leipzig University. Fritzsch played the fantasias for the first time after their rediscovery in two concerts as part of the 23rd Magdeburger Telemann-Festtage on 19 and 20 March 2016, along with a recording (made at the abbey church of Zscheiplitz) and the presentation of the edition.

They prepared a revised catalogue of the compositions by Abel, published by Ortus Musikverlag in 2023, the year of the composer's tricentenary. The Catalogue of Works of Carl Friedrich Abel, or AbelWV was edited by Günter von Zadow.

References

External links 

 
 Frühere Hefte / Inhaltsübersicht Viola da gamba-Gesellschaft

Güntersberg
Güntersberg
German companies established in 1990
Publishing companies established in 1990